The Ohio State League was a minor league baseball league that operated in numerous seasons between 1887 and 1947, predominantly as a Class D level league. League franchises were based in Indiana, Kentucky, Michigan, Ohio and West Virginia.

History
The first "Ohio State League" was a baseball league in 1887 before changing names to the Tri-State League. The Kalamazoo Kazoos won the first league championship. The league played in the 1889 and 1898 seasons.

The first 20th century Ohio State League started in 1908 as a class D loop and ran through 1916.

Another Ohio State League was formed in 1936 and ran through 1947 except for a break in '42-'43 due to World War II. In 1945, the OSL was one of just four class D circuits in operation, yet it was one of the first of dozens of leagues to collapse after World War II.

The class D Ohio–Indiana League was formed in 1948 with eight teams, with seven of the eight cities coming from the Ohio State League. Six teams made their home in Ohio and the remaining two where from Indiana. This league lasted through
1951.

The Portsmouth Cobblers won four Ohio State League championships.

Baseball Hall of Fame member Ed Delahanty played for the 1887 Mansfield team.

Cities represented

Akron, Ohio:  Akron Acorns 1887, 1889
Canton, Ohio:  Canton 1887, 1898
Charleston, West Virginia:  Charleston Senators 1913–1916
Chillicothe, Ohio:  Chillicothe Infants 1910–1912; Chillicothe Babes 1913–1916
Columbus, Ohio:  Columbus Buckeyes 1887
Coshocton, Ohio: Coshocton 1898
Dayton, Ohio:  Dayton Indians 1946–1947
Findlay, Ohio:  Findlay Browns 1937–1938; Findlay Oilers (baseball) 1939–1940; Findlay Browns 1941
Fostoria, Ohio:  Fostoria Cardinals 1936; Fostoria Red Birds 1937–1941
Frankfort, Kentucky:  Frankfort Old Taylors 1915–1916
Fremont, Ohio:  Fremont Reds 1936–1938; Fremont Green Sox 1938–1941
Hamilton, Ohio:  Hamilton Mechanics 1911; Hamilton Maroons 1913
Huntington, West Virginia:  Huntington Blue Sox 1913–1914 Huntington Boosters 1916
Ironton, Ohio:  Ironton Orphans 1912; Ironton Nailers 1913–1915
Kalamazoo, Michigan:  Kalamazoo Kazoos 1887
Lancaster, Ohio:  Lancaster Lanks 1908–1911
Lexington, Kentucky:  Lexington Colts 1913–1916
Lima, Ohio:  Lima Cigarmakers 1908–1912; Lima Pandas 1939–1941; Lima Red Birds 1944; Lima Reds 1945; Lima Terriers 1946–1947
Mansfield, Ohio: Mansfield 1887; Mansfield Pioneers 1908–1909; Mansfield Brownies 1912; Mansfield Tigers 1936; Mansfield Red Sox 1937; Mansfield Braves 1939–1941
Marion, Ohio:  Marion Diggers 1908–1912; Marion Presidents 1937; Marion Diggers 1944; Marion Cardinals 1945–1946; Marion Cubs
Massillon, Ohio: Massillion 1898
Maysville, Kentucky: Maysville 1913–1914; Maysville Angels 1915; Maysville Burley Cubs 1916
Middletown, Ohio:  Middletown Red Sox 1944; Middletown Rockets 1945–1946
Muncie, Indiana:  Muncie Reds 1947
Newark, Ohio:  Newark 1889; Newark Newks 1908–1911; Newark Skeeters 1912; Newark Moundsmen 1944–1947
Newport, Kentucky: Newport Brewers 1914
New Philadelphia, Ohio:  New Philadelphia Red Birds 1936
Paris, Kentucky: Paris 1914
Piqua, Ohio:  Piqua Picks 1911
Portsmouth, Ohio:  Portsmouth Cobblers 1908–1915; Portsmouth Truckers (1916)
Richmond, Indiana:  Richmond Roses 1946–1947 
Salem, Ohio: Salem 1898
Sandusky, Ohio:  Sandusky Suds 1887; Sandusky Sailors 1936–1937
Springfield, Ohio:  Springfield Reapers 1908, 1911; Springfield Giants 1944–1947
Steubenville, Ohio:  Steubenville Stubs 1887
Tiffin, Ohio: Tiffin 1889;  Tiffin Mud Hens 1936–1941
Wheeling, West Virginia:  Wheeling 1887; Wheeling Nailers 1898
Youngstown, Ohio: Youngstown 1889
Zanesville, Ohio:  Zanesville Kickapoos 1887; Zanesville Clay Diggers 1898; Zanesville Dodgers 1944–1947

Standings & statistics

1887, 1889, 1898

1887 Ohio State League
 Canton entered the league August 4;  Akron disbanded September 3; tubenville disbanded June 29.

1889 Ohio State League
Newark disbanded September 16; Tiffin disbanded September 18

1898 Ohio State League
 Zanesville entered the league May 30; Conshohockten disbanded June 2 The league disbanded June 5 due to poor weather and Sunday baseball restrictions

1908 to 1916
1908 Ohio State League
Springfield moved to Portsmouth June 16.

1909 Ohio State League
 Newark and Lancaster both disbanded August 23.

1910 Ohio State League

1911 Ohio State League
Newark moved to Piqua June 22.

1912 Ohio State League
Marion moved to Ironton July 15.

1913 Ohio State League

1914 Ohio State League
Ironton disbanded July 5; Newport-Paris disbanded July 5; Huntington and Maysville both disbanded July 22.

1915 Ohio State League
Chillicothe moved to Huntington July 13; Huntington moved to Maysville July 19.
Playoff: Portsmouth 4 games, Maysville 1.

1916 Ohio State League
Huntington & Frankfort disbanded July 16; Charleston moved to Chillicothe July 13; Lexington disbanded July 16 The league disbanded July 19.

1936 to 1941 

1936 Ohio State League
Mansfield and New Philadelphia both disbanded May 26.

1937 Ohio State League
Sandusky moved to Marion June22.

1938 Ohio State League
 Playoff: Freemont 3 games, Fostoria 0.

1939 Ohio State League
 Playoff: Lima defeated Tiffin in a one-game playoff for fourth place. Freemont won 2nd place by coin toss. Findley 2 games, Fostoria 0; Lima 2 games, Fremont 1 Finals: Lima 4 games, Findlay 3;

1940 Ohio State League
 Playoff: Lima 3 games, Mansfield 0; Findley 3 games, Tiffin 1 Finals: Lima 4 Games, Findley 2.

1941 Ohio State League

No League play 1942 & 1943 due to WW II.

1944 to 1947
1944 Ohio State League
Playoffs: Newark 3 games, Lima 1;Middletown 3 games, Springfield 2 Finals: Newark 4 games, Middletown 2.

1945 Ohio State League
Playoffs: Middletown 4 games, Springfield 2; Zanesville 4 games, Lima 2 Finals: Zanesville 3 games, Middletown 2.

1946 Ohio State League
Playoffs: Zanesville 4 games, Richmond 0; Springfield 4 games, Newark 2. Finals: Zanesville 4 games, Springfield 2.

1947 Ohio State League
Playoffs: Zanesville 4 games, Springfield 0; Marion 4 games, Muncie 1; Finals: Zanesville 4 games, Marion 2.

League records 1887–1951

See the Ohio–Indiana League for 1948-51

Further reading
Craig Lammers: "Death in the Ohio State League", in The National Pastime – A Review of Baseball History, Society for American Baseball Research, Cleveland, Ohio, number 26 (May, 2006), pp. 125–128.

Sources
The Encyclopedia of Minor League Baseball; Second Edition
Image is user created not original.

External links
Baseball Reference
12/6/45 TSN 1945 recap by President Colley

 
Baseball leagues in Ohio
Defunct minor baseball leagues in the United States
Baseball leagues in Kentucky
Baseball leagues in West Virginia
Baseball leagues in Michigan
Sports leagues established in 1887
Sports leagues disestablished in 1947
Baseball leagues in Indiana